In the branch of mathematics known as real analysis, the Riemann integral, created by Bernhard Riemann, was the first rigorous definition of the integral of a function on an interval.  It was presented to the faculty at the University of Göttingen in 1854, but not published in a journal until 1868. For many functions and practical applications, the Riemann integral can be evaluated by the fundamental theorem of calculus or approximated by numerical integration.

Overview 

Let  be a non-negative real-valued function on the interval , and let  be the region of the plane under the graph of the function  and above the interval . See the figure on the top right. This region can be expressed in set-builder notation as

Once we have measured it, we will denote the area in the usual way by

By taking better and better approximations, we can say that "in the limit" we get exactly the area of  under the curve.

Definition

Partitions of an interval 

A partition of an interval  is a finite sequence of numbers of the form

Each  is called a sub-interval of the partition. The mesh or norm of a partition is defined to be the length of the longest sub-interval, that is,

The mesh of a tagged partition is the same as that of an ordinary partition.

That is, a tagged partition breaks up some of the sub-intervals and adds sample points where necessary, "refining" the accuracy of the partition.

We can turn the set of all tagged partitions into a directed set by saying that one tagged partition is greater than or equal to another if the former is a refinement of the latter.

Riemann sum 
Let  be a real-valued function defined on the interval .

Each term in the sum is the product of the value of the function at a given point and the length of an interval. Consequently, each term represents the (signed) area of a rectangle with height  and width . The Riemann sum is the (signed) area of all the rectangles.

Closely related concepts are the lower and upper Darboux sums.

(When  is discontinuous on a subinterval, there may not be a tag that achieves the infimum or supremum on that subinterval.) The Darboux integral, which is similar to the Riemann integral but based on Darboux sums, is equivalent to the Riemann integral.

Riemann integral 
Loosely speaking, the Riemann integral is the limit of the Riemann sums of a function as the partitions get finer. If the limit exists then the function is said to be integrable (or more specifically Riemann-integrable). The Riemann sum can be made as close as desired to the Riemann integral by making the partition fine enough.

One important requirement is that the mesh of the partitions must become smaller and smaller, so that in the limit, it is zero. If this were not so, then we would not be getting a good approximation to the function on certain subintervals. In fact, this is enough to define an integral. To be specific, we say that the Riemann integral of  equals  if the following condition holds:

Unfortunately, this definition is very difficult to use. It would help to develop an equivalent definition of the Riemann integral which is easier to work with. We develop this definition now, with a proof of equivalence following. Our new definition says that the Riemann integral of  equals  if the following condition holds:

These definitions are actually a special case of a more general concept, a net.

As we stated earlier, these two definitions are equivalent. In other words,  works in the first definition if and only if  works in the second definition.

To show that the second definition implies the first, it is easiest to use the Darboux integral. First, one shows that the second definition is equivalent to the definition of the Darboux integral; for this see the Darboux Integral article. Now we will show that a Darboux integrable function satisfies the first definition. Fix , and choose a partition  such that the lower and upper Darboux sums with respect to this partition are within  of the value  of the Darboux integral. Let

If , then  is the zero function, which is clearly both Darboux and Riemann integrable with integral zero. Therefore, we will assume that . If , then we choose  such that

If , then we choose  to be less than one.

To see this, choose an interval .

If all intervals had this property, then this would conclude the proof, because each term in the Riemann sum would be bounded by a corresponding term in the Darboux sums, and we chose the Darboux sums to be near . This is the case when , so the proof is finished in that case.

Therefore, we may assume that . (It cannot meet three intervals because  is assumed to be smaller than the length of any one interval.) In symbols, it may happen that

This can happen at most  times.

The term  in the Riemann sum splits into two terms:

Suppose, without loss of generality, that . Then

To bound the other term, notice that

It follows that, for some (indeed any) ,

Since this happens at most  times, the distance between the Riemann sum and a Darboux sum is at most .

Examples 
Let  be the function which takes the value 1 at every point.

This function does not have a Riemann integral. To prove this, we will show how to construct tagged partitions whose Riemann sums get arbitrarily close to both zero and one.

Choose . Then, by carefully choosing the new tags, we can make the value of the Riemann sum turn out to be within  of either zero or one.

Our first step is to cut up the partition. This makes the total sum at least zero and at most .

Now we add two cuts to the partition for each . If one of these leaves the interval [0, 1], then we leave it out.  will be the tag corresponding to the subinterval

We still have to choose tags for the other subintervals. We will choose them in two different ways. The first way is to always choose a rational point, so that the Riemann sum is as large as possible. This will make the value of the Riemann sum at least . The second way is to always choose an irrational point, so that the Riemann sum is as small as possible. This will make the value of the Riemann sum at most .

Since we started from an arbitrary partition and ended up as close as we wanted to either zero or one, it is false to say that we are eventually trapped near some number , so this function is not Riemann integrable. However, it is Lebesgue integrable. In the Lebesgue sense its integral is zero, since the function is zero almost everywhere. But this is a fact that is beyond the reach of the Riemann integral.

There are even worse examples.  is equivalent (that is, equal almost everywhere) to a Riemann integrable function, but there are non-Riemann integrable bounded functions which are not equivalent to any Riemann integrable function. For example, let  be the Smith–Volterra–Cantor set, and let  be its indicator function. Because  is not Jordan measurable,  is not Riemann integrable. Therefore,  is not Riemann integrable.

Similar concepts 

It is popular to define the Riemann integral as the Darboux integral. This is because the Darboux integral is technically simpler and because a function is Riemann-integrable if and only if it is Darboux-integrable.

Some calculus books do not use general tagged partitions, but limit themselves to specific types of tagged partitions. If the type of partition is limited too much, some non-integrable functions may appear to be integrable.

One popular restriction is the use of "left-hand" and "right-hand" Riemann sums. In a left-hand Riemann sum,  for all , and in a right-hand Riemann sum,  for all . Alone this restriction does not impose a problem: we can refine any partition in a way that makes it a left-hand or right-hand sum by subdividing it at each . In more formal language, the set of all left-hand Riemann sums and the set of all right-hand Riemann sums is cofinal in the set of all tagged partitions.

Another popular restriction is the use of regular subdivisions of an interval. For example, the th regular subdivision of  consists of the intervals

Again, alone this restriction does not impose a problem, but the reasoning required to see this fact is more difficult than in the case of left-hand and right-hand Riemann sums.

However, combining these restrictions, so that one uses only left-hand or right-hand Riemann sums on regularly divided intervals, is dangerous. If a function is known in advance to be Riemann integrable, then this technique will give the correct value of the integral. The problem with this definition becomes apparent when we try to split the integral into two pieces. The following equation ought to hold:

If we use regular subdivisions and left-hand or right-hand Riemann sums, then the two terms on the left are equal to zero, since every endpoint except 0 and 1 will be irrational, but as we have seen the term on the right will equal 1.

As defined above, the Riemann integral avoids this problem by refusing to integrate  The Lebesgue integral is defined in such a way that all these integrals are 0.

Properties

Linearity 

Because the Riemann integral of a function is a number, this makes the Riemann integral a linear functional on the vector space of Riemann-integrable functions.

Integrability 
A bounded function on a compact interval  is Riemann integrable if and only if it is continuous almost everywhere (the set of its points of discontinuity has measure zero, in the sense of Lebesgue measure). It has been proven independently by Giuseppe Vitali and by Henri Lebesgue in 1907, and uses the notion of measure zero, but makes use of neither Lebesgue's general measure or integral.

The integrability condition can be proven in various ways, one of which is sketched below.

In particular, any set that is at most countable has Lebesgue measure zero, and thus a bounded function (on a compact interval) with only finitely or countably many discontinuities is Riemann integrable.

An indicator function of a bounded set is Riemann-integrable if and only if the set is Jordan measurable. The Riemann integral can be interpreted measure-theoretically as the integral with respect to the Jordan measure.

If a real-valued function is monotone on the interval  it is Riemann integrable, since its set of discontinuities is at most countable, and therefore of Lebesgue measure zero. That is, Riemann-integrability is a stronger (meaning more difficult to satisfy) condition than Lebesgue-integrability. The converse does not hold; not all Lebesgue-integrable functions are Riemann integrable.

In fact, certain discontinuities have absolutely no role on the Riemann integrability of the function—a consequence of the classification of the discontinuities of a function.

However, the Lebesgue monotone convergence theorem (on a monotone pointwise limit) does not hold for Riemann integrals. Thus, in Riemann integration, taking limits under the integral sign is far more difficult to logically justify than in Lebesgue integration.

Generalizations 
It is easy to extend the Riemann integral to functions with values in the Euclidean vector space  for any . The integral is defined component-wise; in other words, if  then

In particular, since the complex numbers are a real vector space, this allows the integration of complex valued functions.

The Riemann integral is only defined on bounded intervals, and it does not extend well to unbounded intervals. The simplest possible extension is to define such an integral as a limit, in other words, as an improper integral:

This definition carries with it some subtleties, such as the fact that it is not always equivalent to compute the Cauchy principal value

By symmetry,

But there are many ways for the interval of integration to expand to fill the real line, and other ways can produce different results; in other words, the multivariate limit does not always exist. We can compute

In general, this improper Riemann integral is undefined. Even standardizing a way for the interval to approach the real line does not work because it leads to disturbingly counterintuitive results. If we agree (for instance) that the improper integral should always be

then the integral of the translation  is −2, so this definition is not invariant under shifts, a highly undesirable property. In fact, not only does this function not have an improper Riemann integral, its Lebesgue integral is also undefined (it equals ).

Unfortunately, the improper Riemann integral is not powerful enough. The most severe problem is that there are no widely applicable theorems for commuting improper Riemann integrals with limits of functions. In applications such as Fourier series it is important to be able to approximate the integral of a function using integrals of approximations to the function.

On non-compact intervals such as the real line, this is false. For all  we have:

The sequence  converges uniformly to the zero function, and clearly the integral of the zero function is zero. Consequently,

This demonstrates that for integrals on unbounded intervals, uniform convergence of a function is not strong enough to allow passing a limit through an integral sign. This makes the Riemann integral unworkable in applications (even though the Riemann integral assigns both sides the correct value), because there is no other general criterion for exchanging a limit and a Riemann integral, and without such a criterion it is difficult to approximate integrals by approximating their integrands.

A better route is to abandon the Riemann integral for the Lebesgue integral. The definition of the Lebesgue integral is not obviously a generalization of the Riemann integral, but it is not hard to prove that every Riemann-integrable function is Lebesgue-integrable and that the values of the two integrals agree whenever they are both defined. Moreover, a function  defined on a bounded interval is Riemann-integrable if and only if it is bounded and the set of points where  is discontinuous has Lebesgue measure zero.

An integral which is in fact a direct generalization of the Riemann integral is the Henstock–Kurzweil integral.

Another way of generalizing the Riemann integral is to replace the factors  in the definition of a Riemann sum by something else; roughly speaking, this gives the interval of integration a different notion of length. This is the approach taken by the Riemann–Stieltjes integral.

Comparison with other theories of integration
The Riemann integral is unsuitable for many theoretical purposes. Some of the technical deficiencies in Riemann integration can be remedied with the Riemann–Stieltjes integral, and most disappear with the Lebesgue integral, though the latter does not have a satisfactory treatment of improper integrals.  The gauge integral is a generalisation of the Lebesgue integral that is at once closer to the Riemann integral.   
These more general theories allow for the integration of more "jagged" or "highly oscillating" functions whose Riemann integral does not exist; but the theories give the same value as the Riemann integral when it does exist.

In educational settings, the Darboux integral offers a simpler definition that is easier to work with; it can be used to introduce the Riemann integral. The Darboux integral is defined whenever the Riemann integral is, and always gives the same result. Conversely, the gauge integral is a simple but more powerful generalization of the Riemann integral and has led some educators to advocate that it should replace the Riemann integral in introductory calculus courses.

See also 
 Area
 Antiderivative
 Lebesgue integration

Notes

References 
 Shilov, G. E., and Gurevich, B. L., 1978. Integral, Measure, and Derivative: A Unified Approach, Richard A. Silverman, trans. Dover Publications. .

External links

 

Definitions of mathematical integration
Bernhard Riemann